"Hate to Say I Told You So" is the first single from Swedish rock band the Hives' second studio album, Veni Vidi Vicious. It was first released as a single on 4 December 2000 and was later re-released in several countries in 2002. It is internationally known as the Hives' signature song.

It was nominated for the Kerrang! Award for Best Single in 2002. In March 2005, Q placed it at number 54 in its list of the 100 Greatest Guitar Tracks. It also lists at 244 on Pitchfork Medias Top 500 songs of the 2000s (decade). In October 2011, NME placed it at number 84 on its list "150 Best Tracks of the Past 15 Years".

Track listings
Swedish CD single and US 7-inch single
"Hate to Say I Told You So"
"Die, All Right!"

European CD single
"Hate to Say I Told You So"
"Fever"
"Barely Homosapien"

US and Australian CD single
"Hate to Say I Told You So" – 3:22
"Die, All Right!" – 2:48
"The Hives Are Law, You Are Crime" – 2:29

Charts

Certifications

Release history

References

2000 debut singles
2000 songs
2002 singles
Burning Heart Records singles
The Hives songs